Agabus fuscipennis is a species of beetle native to the Palearctic (including Europe) and the Nearctic. In Europe, it is only found in Austria, Belarus, the Czech Republic, mainland Denmark, Estonia, Finland, Germany, mainland Italy, Kaliningrad, Latvia, Lithuania, mainland Norway, Poland, Russia, Sardinia, Sicily, Slovakia, Sweden, and Ukraine.

External links

Agabus fuscipennis at Fauna Europaea

fuscipennis
Beetles described in 1798